Hoplocoryphidae is a newly erected (2019) family of praying mantids, based on the type genus Hoplocorypha. As part of a major revision of mantid taxonomy, genera have been moved here from the subfamily Hoplocoryphinae of the previously polyphyletic family Thespidae. The family Hoplocoryphidae is the only member of superfamily Hoplocoryphoidea. Species in this family have been recorded from tropical Africa.

Genera 
The Mantodea Species File lists:
 Apterocorypha Roy, 1966
 Hoplocorypha Stal, 1871
 Hoplocoryphella Giglio-Tos, 1916

See also
List of mantis genera and species

References

External links 

Mantodea families